Magdalena de Cao District is one of eight districts of the province Ascope in Peru.

References